Queen Anhye of the Yu clan (d. 1232) or formally called as Grand Queen Mother Anhye was a Goryeo princess as the first and oldest daughter of King Huijong and Queen Seongpyeong who became a queen consort through her marriage with her second cousin, King Gojong as his first and primary wife.

Life 
The future Queen Anhye was born as the first daughter (Royal Princess) of Huijong of Goryeo and Queen Seongpyeong. She later married her second cousin, Gojong of Goryeo and changed her clan into Yu (유씨). Her mother-in-law, Queen Wondeok was initially her aunt and the daughter of Princess Changrak who also changed her clan to Yu.

In 1211, she honoured as Princess Seungbok (승복궁주, 承福宮主) not long after her marriage with Gojong and lived in "Seungbok Palace" (승복궁, 承福宮). She then formally became a Queen Consort followed her husband's ascension to the throne in 1218. They had two sons and a daughter.

However, she died in 1232 (19th year reign of her husband) and her husband then wore mourning clothes for three days and grieve over her death. The then-governor Choe U gave her a coffin made of gold and silver. At the time she died, her parents (in exile?) were still alive and was said to be so sad when hear this news.

After her death, Gojong didn't remarried again, so it was presumed that they had a good relationship both as cousin and spouse. She then received her Posthumous name and honoured as Queen Mother (태후, 太后) after their oldest son ascended the throne as King Wonjong in 1260.

In popular culture
Portrayed by Han Ye-in in the 2003-2004 KBS TV series Age of Warriors.

References

External links
Queen Anhye on Encykorea .
안혜태후 on Doosan Encyclopedia .

12th-century births
1232 deaths
Royal consorts of the Goryeo Dynasty
Korean queens consort
13th-century Korean women